Anton Matveyenko (born 28 April 1989) is a retired Belarusian professional footballer.

External links

1989 births
Living people
Belarusian footballers
FC Gomel players
FC DSK Gomel players
FC Lida players
Association football defenders